Makis Chatzis (born 30 March 1957) is a Greek former professional footballer who played as full-back.

Club career
Chatzis began his football career at APON Smyrnis, where he played until 1979, when he moved to Apollon Athens. In the summer of 1984 he was transferred to AEK Athens. He immediately became a key player of the club, playing mainly on the right side of the defense, but he was also used as a left-back. He was competed in the club's big European games with opponents such as Real Madrid, Internazionale, Athletic Bilbao, and Marseille. In 1987, with the arrival of Christos Vasilopoulos in the team, Chatzis began losing his place in the starting line-up. However, he was used quite often at both sides of the defense, while in 1989 he won the championship with the "yellow-blacks". After the promotion of Georgios Koutoulas and the signing of Vaios Karagiannis, his appearances were cut even more. In his 8-year spell at AEK he did not manage to score a sigle goal in any official match. With AEK he won 2 Championships, 1 Super Cup and 1 League Cup. In the summer of 1992 he decided to retire from football at the age of 35.

After football
Chatzis has from time to time a strong participation in the association of veteran footballers of AEK.

Honours

AEK Athens 
Alpha Ethniki: 1988–89, 1991–92
Greek Super Cup: 1989
Greek League Cup: 1990

References

1957 births
Living people
Super League Greece players
Apollon Smyrnis F.C. players
AEK Athens F.C. players
Association football defenders
Footballers from Athens
Greek footballers